John Vicars (1582, London – 12 April 1652, Christ's Hospital, Greyfriars, London) was an English contemporary biographer, poet and polemicist of the English Civil War. His best-known work is English Worthies or England's Worthies, whose full title is England's Worthies under whom all the Civil and Bloudy Warres since Anno 1642 to Anno 1647 are related.

Life
Descended from a Cumberland family, he was educated at Christ's Hospital and Queen's College, Oxford (though it is unknown if he graduated from the latter). He then left Oxford to return to Christ's Hospital as its Usher, a post he then held until his death. During the War itself he favoured Presbyterianism and opposed the Independents. He survived the war and died in 1652.

Sources
Online text of England's Worthies
. 

1582 births
1652 deaths
English biographers
People from the City of London
People of the English Civil War
People educated at Christ's Hospital
Alumni of The Queen's College, Oxford
English male poets
Male biographers